Pascal Hakizimana is a retired Burundian footballer who played as a midfielder.

International career
He was invited by Lofty Naseem, the national team coach, to represent Burundi in the 2014 African Nations Championship held in South Africa.

References

1993 births
Living people
Burundian footballers
Muzinga FC players
Flambeau de l'Est FC players
Vital'O F.C. players
2014 African Nations Championship players
Burundi A' international footballers
Burundi international footballers
Association football midfielders